Maurizio de Giovanni (born March 31, 1958 in Napoli) is an Italian author of mystery novels.

Biography 
Maurizio de Giovanni was born in Naples in 1958; he has spent the majority of his life living and working there. In 2005 he decided to join a Porsche Italia competition reserved for giallo novelists, and that's where he came up with the character of Commissario Ricciardi, main protagonist of his first short story, “I vivi e I morti”. This was the start of his career as a writer. Subsequently, I Vivi e i morti served as an inspiration for Le lacrime del pagliaccio (later re-published as I will have vengeance – The winter of commissario Ricciardi), edited by Graus Editore.

With the publishing of this novel, the chronicles of Commissario Ricciardi began.

In 2007, Fandango published I will have vengeance – The winter of commissario Ricciardi, De Giovanni's first work inspired to the 4 seasons of the year. Following this, in 2008, Blood curse – The springtime of commissario Ricciardi was released. In 2009 came Everyone in their place – The summer of commissario Ricciardi and finally, in 2010, The day of the dead – The autumn of commissario Ricciardi was released. He started to gain a wider audience and made a name for himself because of this series.

In 2011 he had his first book published by Einaudi, By my hand – A commissario Ricciardi mystery.

In 2012 de Giovanni wrote in the noir genre with a book titled The Crocodile, that marked the first appearance on the scenes of the new main character of his novels, Ispettore Lojacono.

In the same year, together with Einaudi, he published the pocket version of the seasons’ novels and the brand new Viper – A commissario Ricciardi mystery.

In 2013 The Bastards of Pizzofalcone, inspired by the 87th Precinct series from Ed McBain, was released. This marked his transition from the noir genre to the police procedural. Shortly after, De Giovanni wrote Darkness for the Bastards of Pizzofalcone. These novels will be transformed into a TV show.

In the same month as Darkness was completed, his short story Un giorno di Settembre a Natale, contained in the anthology Regalo di Natale, was published by the editor Sellerio.

2014 was a prolific year for de Giovanni. Not only were 15 of his noir stories released in the Mani insanguinate anthology, he also had two new novels published: Bottom of your heart (by Einaudi) and Gelo per i bastardi di Pizzofalcone.

In 2015, Glass souls, the 8th installment in the Ricciardi's series, was released. In the same year, he appeared at an event at the Italian Cultural Institute in Edinburgh, in conversation with academic Raffaella Ocone discussing the success of the detective story.

In 2016, de Giovanni had both Serenata senza nome. Notturno per il commissario Ricciardi and Pane per i Bastardi di Pizzofalcone published.

The majority of his works are currently translated into the following languages: English, Spanish, Catalan, French and German.

Commissario Ricciardi's series 
 2006 – Le lacrime del pagliaccio, Graus Editore; re-published in 2007, by Fandango, as I will have vengeance – The winter of commissario Ricciardi.
 2008 – Blood curse – The springtime of commissario Ricciardi, Fandango
 2009 – Everyone in their place – The summer of commissario Ricciardi, Fandango
 2010 – The day of the dead – The autumn of commissario Ricciardi, Fandango
 2011 – By my hand, A commissario Ricciardi mystery, Einaudi
 2012 – L'omicidio Carosino. Le prime indagini del commissario Ricciardi, Cento Autori
 2012 – Viper, a commissario Ricciardi mystery, Einaudi
 2014 – Febbre (racconto contenuto nell'antologia Giochi criminali), Einaudi)
 2014 – Bottom of your heart. Inferno for commissario Ricciardi, Einaudi
 2015 – Glass Souls, Einaudi
 2016 – Nameless Serenade. A commissario Ricciardi mystery, Einaudi
 2017 – Rondini d'inverno. Sipario per il commissario Ricciardi, Einaudi
 2018 – Il purgatorio dell'angelo. Confessioni per il commissario Ricciardi, Einaudi

Ispettore Lojacono's series 
 2012 – The Crocodile, Mondadori
 2013 – The bastards of Pizzofalcone, Einaudi
 2013 – Darkness for the  bastards of Pizzofalcone, Einaudi
 2014 – Gelo per i bastardi di Pizzofalcone, Einaudi
 2015 – Cuccioli per i bastardi di Pizzofalcone, Einaudi
 2016 – Pane per i bastardi di Pizzofalcone, Einaudi

Articles and short stories about sports 
 2008 – Juve-Napoli 1–3 – la presa di Torino, Cento Autori
 2009 – Ti racconto il 10 maggio, Cento Autori
 2010 – Miracolo a Torino – Juve Napoli 2–3, Cento Autori
 2010 – Storie azzurre, Cento Autori (antologia di racconti)
 2010 – Maradona è meglio 'e Pelé (short article contained in “Per segnare bisogna tirare in porta”, Spartaco)
 2014 – La partita di pallone – Storie di calcio, Sellerio editore (anthology)
 2015 – Il resto della settimana, Rizzoli

Other works 
 2005 – Il maschio dominante, Graus & Boniello
 2007 – Le beffe della cena ovvero piccolo manuale dell'intrattenimento in piedi, Kairòs
 2010 – L'ombra nello specchio, Kairòs
 2010 – Mammarella, Cagliostro ePress
 2011 – Scusi, un ricordo del terremoto dell'ottanta? (short story contained in the anthology Trema la terra, Neo edizioni e Una lunga notte, Cento Autori)
 2012 – Gli altri fantasmi, Spartaco
 2012 – Respirando in discesa, Senza Patria
 2012 – Per amore di Nami, Zefiro
 2013 – Gli altri, Tunué (comic book derived from Gli altri fantasmi)
 2013 – Un giorno di Settembre a Natale (racconto contenuto nell'antologia Regalo di Natale, Sellerio editore)
 2013 – Il tappo del 128 (racconto contenuto nell'antologia Racconti in sala d'attesa, Caracò)
 2014 – Le mani insanguinate, Cento Autori (anthology)
 2014 – Verità imperfette, Del Vecchio Editore (co-written with other authors)
 2015 – Ti voglio bene in Roberto Colonna (a cura di), Il fantastico. Tradizioni a confronto, Salerno, Edizioni Arcoiris, 2014
 2015 – Istantanee in "Nessuno ci ridurrà al silenzio (a cura di Maurizio de Giovanni), Cento Autori (anthology)
 2015 – Una mano sul volto, Ed. Ad est dell'equatore (contained in an anthology against the violence on women)
 2015 – La Solitudine dell'anima, Cento Autori (anthology) , A secret short story about a young Ricciardi is contained in this anthology.

Theatre

Adaptation 
 2015 – Qualcuno volò sul nido del cuculo, directed by Alessandro Gassmann

Television

Scriptwriter 
 2017 – I Bastardi di Pizzofalcone, TV show, directed by Carlo Carlei.

References 

1958 births
Living people
Writers from Naples
Italian male novelists